Artist Partner Group, Inc. (APG) is an American record label and music publishing company founded by Mike Caren, who is also the CEO. The label's parent company does publishing under the name Artist Publishing Group.

History 
Artist Partner Group was founded  in 2012  by music executive Mike Caren. The group is a sister platform to Artist Publishing Group which was earlier founded in 2004. Both entities are collectively known as APG.

Artist Partner Group originally began as a joint venture with Atlantic Records and Warner Music Group. Over 8 years, the label became known for signing artists such as YoungBoy Never Broke Again, Charlie Puth, Kehlani, Ava Max, Kevin Gates, Jason Derulo, NLE Choppa, Don Toliver, Alec Benjamin, Bazzi, Lil Skies, Faouzia and Rico Nasty.

In November of 2020, APG ended their 8 year joint venture with Atlantic Records to go fully independent.

See also 
 Taz Taylor
 Madison Love
 Sam Martin
 Amy Allen
 Breyan Isaac
 Today
 soFly and Nius
 DJ Frank E
 Oh, Hush!
 NLE Choppa
 YoungBoy Never Broke Again
 Don Toliver
 Ava Max
 Jason Derulo
 Rico Nasty
 Charlie Puth
 Kehlani

References

American record labels
American independent record labels
Record labels established in 2012